Miodrag Živković (Serbian Cyrillic: Миодраг Живковић; 1928 – 31 July 2020) was a Serbian sculptor and university professor. He is well-known for his work on memorial complexes throughout Yugoslavia.

Biography 
Živković was born in Leskovac. After moving to Belgrade with his family in 1944, he graduated from the Academy of Applied Arts in Belgrade in 1952. After working as an arts teaching instructor in Mladenovac and Novi Beograd, he was employed as an assistant professor at the Faculty of Applied Arts within the University of Arts in Belgrade, becoming Dean in 1974, a position he occupied until 1977. From 1977 to 1984 he was head of the Faculty's sculpture department. From 1991 to 1996 he was again Dean of the Faculty.

He died in Belgrade on 31 July 2020.

Works 
Outside of academia, Živković is known as the creator of a number of sculptures throughout the territory of the Former Yugoslavia and abroad, including the following:

 "Broken Wings", Kragujevac, Serbia (1963)
 Monument to Yugoslav Immigrants, Punta Arenas, Chile (1970)
 Valley of Heroes, Tjentište, Bosnia & Herzegovina (1971)
 Monument to Fallen Fighters, Priština, Kosovo (1971)
 Monumental Crypt, Gonars, Italy (1973)
 Memorial Park "Uprising and Revolution", Grahovo, Montenegro (1978)
 Kadinjača Memorial Complex, near Užice, Serbia (1952–1979)
 "Freedom", Ulcinj, Montenegro (1985)
 Monument to the Royal Yugoslav Air Force defenders of Belgrade, New Belgrade, Serbia (1994)

Gallery

References

External links
Interview with Miodrag Živković

1928 births
2020 deaths
University of Arts in Belgrade alumni
Academic staff of the University of Arts in Belgrade
20th-century Serbian sculptors
20th-century male artists
21st-century sculptors
21st-century male artists
Male sculptors